Jasmine Waltz is an American model, actress, and reality television personality from Las Vegas, Nevada.

Career
Waltz began modeling while studying at the University of Performing Arts, and appeared in commercials and the televisions sitcom Rules of Engagement.

Waltz had minor roles in films and television shows such as Femme Fatales, Secret Girlfriend, and the film Black Water. She was a contestant in Celebrity Big Brother 13 in 2014 and Celebrity Big Brother 19 in 2017, being evicted on Day 13, in both series. In May 2016 she joined the cast of the series Blade of Honor, as the character H.A.V.I.

References

External links
 

1982 births
Living people
People from Las Vegas
Female models from Nevada
American actresses
Celebrity Big Brother
Big Brother (British TV series) contestants
21st-century American women